The Prix Nadar is an annual prize awarded for a photography book edited in France. The prize was created in 1955 by Association Gens d'Images and is awarded by a jury of photojournalists and publishing experts.

The prize is named after Nadar, the pseudonym of Gaspard-Félix Tournachon, a French photographer who lived from 1820 to 1910.

Some Prix Nadar winners

References

External links

Awards established in 1955
Photojournalism awards
Photography in France
Photography awards
1955 establishments in France